Lakhdenpokhsky (masculine), Lakhdenpokhskaya (feminine), or Lakhdenpokhskoye (neuter) may refer to:
Lakhdenpokhsky District, a district of the Republic of Karelia, Russia
Lakhdenpokhskoye Urban Settlement, a municipal formation which the town of Lakhdenpokhya and the station of Yakkima in Lakhdenpokhsky District of the Republic of Karelia, Russia are incorporated as